Gobabis Constituency is an electoral constituency in the Omaheke Region of Namibia.  it had 13,457 registered voters. The constituency covers the rural area southeast of Gobabis and the town itself, except its Nossobville suburb. Gobabis is also the administrative centre of the constituency.

Politics
The 2015 regional election was won by Phillipus Katamelo of the SWAPO Party with 3,355 votes, followed by Ellenterius Modise of the Democratic Turnhalle Alliance (DTA) with 866 votes and Foreman Kamezuu of the Rally for Democracy and Progress (RDP) with 464 votes. After councillor Katamelo was fielded as a parliamentary candidate in the 2019 Namibian general election, a by-election became necessary for Gobabis because Namibian electoral law prohibits sitting councillors and members of the public service to run for a seat in parliament. The by-election was conducted on 15 January 2020. Augustinus Tebele (SWAPO) won with 1,409 votes, followed by Sylvestor Binga (Landless People's Movement (LPM), 571 votes), Ellenterius Modise (Popular Democratic Movement (PDM), 277 votes) and Iuonga Kauesa (independent, 82 votes).

Councillor Tebele (SWAPO) was reelected in the 2020 regional election with 2,410 votes, followed by Lesley Pienaar (LPM) with 840 votes, independent candidate Izak de Beer with 673 votes, and Elvire Theron of the National Unity Democratic Organisation (NUDO) with 579 votes.

See also
 Administrative divisions of Namibia

References

Constituencies of Omaheke Region
Constituency
States and territories established in 1992
1992 establishments in Namibia